Plinio Corrêa de Oliveira (December 13, 1908 – October 3, 1995) was a Brazilian intellectual and traditionalist Catholic activist, best known for the foundation of Tradition, Family and Property organization.

Biography

Early life 
Corrêa de Oliveira was born in São Paulo to Lucilia Corrêa de Oliveira, a devout Roman Catholic, and educated by Jesuits. In 1928 he joined the Marian Congregations of São Paulo and soon became a leader of that organization. In 1933 he helped organize the Catholic Electoral League, was elected to the nation's Constitutional Convention by the "Catholic bloc", and at 24 became the youngest congressman in Brazil's history.  His view of the Church has been described as ultramontanist and his political ideology anti-Communist.

Several of his articles in A Ordem from the early 1930s expressed views that Jews had amassed "vast wealth and, therefore, decisive influence on business affairs," and that Jews were among the founders of Communism. Corrêa de Oliveira wrote that the Jews, who unlike the Communists were not under surveillance by Brazilian security forces, were thus much more dangerous.

Activism 
He assumed the chair of Modern and Contemporary History at the Pontifical Catholic University of São Paulo. He was also the first president of the São Paulo Archdiocesan Board of Catholic Action.  Corrêa de Oliveira became concerned with what he saw as progressivist deviations within Brazilian Catholic Action, associated with the ideas of the French Catholic philosopher, Jacques Maritain and attacked these changes in his 1943 book, In Defense of Catholic Action.

With the arrival of a new archbishop in São Paulo in 1944, Corrêa de Oliveira lost his position as diocesan head of Catholic Action and in 1947 his directorship of the Catholic weekly Legionário, which he had supervised since 1935.  In 1951 he founded the magazine O Catolicismo, together with the conservative bishops Antônio de Castro Mayer and Geraldo de Proença Sigaud.  From 1968 to 1990 he wrote a column for the Folha de S.Paulo, the city's largest daily newspaper.

Corrêa de Oliveira's Catholic social activism found new targets with the advent of the National Conference of Bishops of Brazil (founded in 1952) and the Latin American Episcopal Conference (CELAM) (founded in 1955) supporting liberation theology, and also with the Cuban revolution of 1959.  To put his ideas into action, he founded the Brazilian Society for the Defence of Tradition, Family and Property (TFP) in 1960.

Corrêa de Oliveira travelled to Rome for the opening session of Vatican II, describing it as "a point in history as sad as the Death of Our Lord" in which the Church was faced by the generalized, co-ordinated, and audacious action of its internal enemies.  Oliveira was accompanied by members of the Brazilian TFP who brought twenty trunks of TFP literature. During the first session of the Council Oliveira provided a secretariat which served Brazilian bishops Antônio de Castro Mayer and Geraldo de Proença Sigaud and other bishops of the traditional faction, who ultimately formed the Coetus Internationalis Patrum. Corrêa de Oliveira's opposition to the direction of the Council continued, and in a 1976 addendum to his book, Revolution and Counter-Revolution, he described Vatican II as "one of the greatest calamities, if not the greatest, in the history of the Church". His strong opposition led to him being described by liberal critics as a "revanchist" within the ultra-traditional faction. However Plinio and those bishops drifted apart, as not all of them demonstrated loyalty to the Pope, while Corrêa de Oliveira did.

He served as president of the Brazilian TFP's national council until his death in 1995. His treatise, Revolution and Counter-Revolution, inspired the founding of autonomous TFP groups in nearly 20 countries worldwide. An admirer of Thomas Aquinas, he was the author of 15 books and over 2,500 essays and articles.

Heralds of the Gospel

Oliveria held his ultimate goal to be the creation of an Religious Order of Chivalry.  Oliveira began organizing said order in the 1960s, under the name “Hermits of San Bento”.  Oliveria believed this religious order would be the commando force of the TFP in an impending worldwide Catholic uprising.  Following Oliveria’s death, João Clá Dias emerged as the new Superior and renamed the Hermits of San Bento into the Heralds of the Gospel on 21 September 1999.

The Heralds of the Gospel have since expanded into a worldwide religious order with members in several countries and its own priests.

Works

In the original Portuguese 
 Em Defesa da Ação Católica, 1943.
 Revolução e Contra-Revolução, 1959.
 Acordo com o regime comunista: Para a Igreja, esperança ou autodemolição?, 1963.
 Reforma Agraria: Questão de Consciência, 1964.
 Declaração do Morro Alto: Programa de política agrária conforme os princípios de "Reforma Agrária - Questão de Consciência", 1964.

 Baldeação ideológica inadvertida e Diálogo, 1965.
 IDOC e Grupos Proféticos: Em ascensão triunfal - A Heresia Modernista, 1969.
 A Igreja ante a escalada da ameaça comunista Apelo aos Bispos Silenciosos, 1976.
 Tribalismo indígena, ideal comuno-missionário para o Brasil no século XXI, 1977.
 Sou Católico: posso ser contra a reforma agrária?, 1981.
 Nobreza e elites tradicionais análogas nas Alocuções de Pio XII ao Patriciado e à Nobreza romana, 1993.

Translated into English 

 Nobility and Analogous Traditional Elites in the Allocutions of Pius XII: A Theme Illuminating American Social History, 1993.
 Revolution and Counter-Revolution, first published in 1974; 3rd edn. (the most recent) pub. 2014; 2002 digital edition.

References

External links 
Society for the Defense of Tradition, Family and Property — Under the control of the Heralds of the Gospel
Instituto Plinio Corrêa de Oliveria (Portuguese) — Under the control of the TFP “Fundadores”
 Revolution and Counter-Revolution ONLINE - in English
 www.PlinioCorreadeOliveira.info (With pages in English)
 (Blog in honour of his 100th birthday, in German)

Brazilian anti-communists
20th-century Brazilian historians
Brazilian Roman Catholics
Catholicism and far-right politics
Conservatism in Brazil
Counter-revolutionaries
Brazilian traditionalist Catholics
Far-right politics in Brazil
Catholic philosophers
Roman Catholic activists
1908 births
1995 deaths
20th-century Brazilian philosophers
Anti-Masonry
Antisemitism in Brazil
Academic staff of the Pontifical Catholic University of São Paulo
Brazilian monarchists
Patrianovists
Tradition, Family, Property